Middle Finger U. is the only studio album by American rapper Sauce Money. It was released on May 23, 2000 via Priority Records. Production was handled by Mr. Rapture, DJ Clark Kent, Spencer Bellamy, Daven "Prestige" Vanderpool, DJ Premier, EZ Elpee, Jaz-O, Marley Marl, Omonte Ward and Sean Combs. It features guest appearances from Jay-Z, Memphis Bleek, Puff Daddy, Bam-Bue and Maverick. The album peaked at #72 on the Billboard 200 and at #19 on Top R&B/Hip-Hop Albums in the United States.

Track listing

Notes
Track #4 contains elements from "Far From Over" by Frank Stallone
Track #9 contains elements from "Time Is Tight" by Booker T. & the M.G.'s
Track #15 contains a sample from "Living inside Your Love" by Earl Klugh
Track #17 contains a sample form "Hot Nights" by Imagination

Charts

References

External links

1999 debut albums
Priority Records albums
Albums produced by DJ Premier
Albums produced by Sean Combs
Albums produced by Marley Marl
Hip hop albums by American artists
Albums produced by Clark Kent (producer)
Albums produced by Jaz-O